Cyperus fucosus is a species of sedge that is native to northern Australia.

See also 
 List of Cyperus species

References 

fucosus
Plants described in 1991
Flora of Queensland
Flora of the Northern Territory
Taxa named by Karen Louise Wilson